This is a list of the administrative and municipal divisions of Moscow Oblast, a federal subject of Russia.

Moscow Oblast is located in the Central Federal District of Russia, and surrounds Moscow, the capital of Russia.  While Moscow hosts the majority of the government bodies of the oblast, it does not officially serve as the oblast's administrative center and is not otherwise associated with the oblast either administratively or municipally.

The oblast is, like other Russian federal subjects, subdivided for the purposes of the state administration and for the purposes of the local self-government, the rights to which are guaranteed by the Constitution of Russia.  While the administrative and municipal divisions are not required by law to be identical, the system of municipal divisions in Moscow Oblast, having been created on the basis of existing administrative divisions, has only minor differences from the system of administrative divisions.

History
The oblast was established within the Russian Soviet Federative Socialist Republic on January 14, 1929, as Central Industrial Oblast from abolished Moscow, Ryazan, Tula, and Tver Governorates, as well as from parts of Kaluga and Vladimir Governorates.  On June 3, 1929, the oblast was given its present name.

In September 1937, the oblast was split into Moscow, Ryazan, and Tula Oblasts, thus establishing itself in its present borders.

A part of Moscow Oblast's territory, including the towns of Troitsk, Shcherbinka, and Moskovsky, urban-type settlements of Kokoshkino and Kiyevsky, as well as parts of territories of Leninsky, Naro-Fominsky, and Podolsky Districts, was transferred to the federal city of Moscow on July 1, 2012.

Administrative division structure
In terms of administrative division, the Oblast is divided into:
cities/towns under the Oblast administration;
urban-type settlements under the Oblast administration;
closed administrative-territorial formations.

Municipal divisions structure

In terms of the local self-government, the Oblast is divided into:
urban okrugs.

List of administrative and municipal divisions

Differences in municipal and administrative divisions
In terms of administrative division,
Krasnoznamensk, Molodyozhny, and Voskhod Urban Okrugs correspond to closed administrative-territorial formations.
The closed administrative-territorial formations of Vlasikha and Zvyozdny gorodok have not yet been municipally incorporated as urban okrugs (as of January 2009).
All other urban okrugs correspond to the cities/towns under the oblast jurisdiction.

See also
Administrative divisions of Moscow

References

Notes

Sources

Moscow Oblast